Daniel O'Connell (born 1968) is an Irish former hurler who played for club side Kilbrittain, divisional team Carbery and at inter-county level with the Cork senior hurling team. He usually lined out in the full-forward line.

Career

O'Connell first played hurling at juvenile and underage levels with the Kilbrittain club. He also lined out as a schoolboy with St. Finbarr's College and was a substitute on their Harty Cup and All-Ireland-winning team in 1984. O'Connell was just 16-years-old when he joined Kilbrittain's adult team and was a member of their Cork JAHC title-winning team in 1985. A decade later, he captained the team to the Cork IHC title after winning a Cork SHC title with Carbery the previous year. O'Connell first appeared on the inter-county scene as a non-playing substitute on the Cork minor hurling team that won the All-Ireland MHC title in 1985. He later won an All-Ireland U21HC title with the under-21 team. O'Connell was drafted onto the Cork senior hurling team during the early stage of the 1988-89 National League. He subsequently joined the junior team and won an All-Ireland medal in that grade in 1994. O'Connell was recalled to the Cork senior team for the 1995-96 National League.

Career statistics

Club

Honours

St. Finbarr's College
All-Ireland Colleges Senior Hurling Championship: 1984
Munster Colleges Senior Hurling Championship  : 1984

Kilbrittain
Cork Intermediate Hurling Championship: 1995 (c)
Cork Junior A Hurling Championship: 1985

Carbery
Cork Senior Hurling Championship: 1994

Cork
All-Ireland Junior Hurling Championship: 1994
Munster Junior Hurling Championship: 1992, 1994, 1996
All-Ireland Under-21 Hurling Championship: 1988
Munster Under-21 Hurling Championship: 1988
All-Ireland Minor Hurling Championship: 1985
Munster Minor Hurling Championship: 1985, 1986

References

1968 births
Living people
Kilbrittain hurlers
Carbery hurlers
Cork inter-county hurlers